Josh Cornell Williams (born August 9, 1976) is a former American football player.

Williams grew up in the Houston, Texas area and attended Cypress Creek High School. He played college football for the University of Michigan from 1996 to 1999.

He was drafted by the Indianapolis Colts in the fourth round (122nd overall pick) of the 2000 NFL Draft. He played six seasons as a defensive tackle for the Colts from 2000 to 2005, appearing in 73 NFL games.

References

1976 births
Living people
Players of American football from Denver
Players of American football from Houston
American football defensive tackles
Michigan Wolverines football players
Indianapolis Colts players